ISBT 128 is a global standard for the identification, labeling, and information transfer of medical products of human origin (MPHO) across international borders and disparate health care systems. MPHO includes blood, cells, tissues, human milk, and organ products.

History
The International Society of Blood Transfusion (ISBT) working group on automation and data processing began in the early 1990s and was later joined by the AABB, the American Red Cross (ARC), the Department of Defense, and the Health Industry Manufacturers Association in the development of the symbology which would come to be known as the ISBT 128 international standard.

The acronym ISBT was originally derived from the important role played by the International Society of Blood Transfusion (ISBT) in the development of the standard.  Today it expands as International Standard for Blood and Transplant. The number 128 reflects the 128 characters of the ASCII 7 bit character set that the standard uses.

The International Council for Commonality in Blood Banking Automation (ICCBBA) was established in 1995 and given the responsibility for implementation and management of the new standard.

Version 1.0 of the ISBT 128 Standard Technical Specification was first published in 1997, and was intended to replace the ABC Codabar and other similar CODABAR-based standards in use in transfusion medicine at that time with a more secure bar code symbology which contains more information. The current version of the ISBT 128 Standard Technical Specification is version 5.8.0.

An article from the World Health Organization states:
"ISBT 128, managed by ICCBBA, is the sole global standard for the identification and coding of MPHO. It supports global governance by providing a donation numbering system that ensures globally unique identification. It is built upon internationally agreed terminology published in the ISBT 128 Standard Terminology which is a publicly available document."

Specification 
The ISBT 128 standard provides the specification for many of the elements of the information environment required in transfusion and transplantation. It contains definitions, reference tables, and data structures. Minimum requirements are also defined for delivery mechanisms and labeling. By complying with ISBT 128, collection and processing facilities can provide electronically readable information that can be read by any other compliant system.

ISBT 128 specifies:
 A donation numbering systems that ensures globally unique identification;
 The information to be transferred, using internationally agreed reference tables;
 An international product reference database;
 The data structures in which this information is placed;
 A bar coding system for transfer of the information on the product label;
 A standard layout for the product label;
 A standard reference for use in electronic messaging.

References

External links
 "What is ISBT 128?". International Council for Commonality in Blood Banking Automation (ICCBBA). Retrieved November 15, 2017.

Transfusion medicine